Government Degree College Shopian (Urdu;) also known as GDC Shopian, is an autonomous degree college affiliated with University of Kashmir, located on a 67 kanal campus in Shopian in the Indian union territory of Jammu and Kashmir.  The college provides admission in more than 146 combinations involving more than 30 subjects.  In addition, the college facilitates off-campus education in collaboration with IGNOU, MANUU and the Department of Distance Education of University of Kashmir.  The college is recognized by the UGC, under sections 2(f) and 12(b).

Location

Establishment
The college was established in 1988 by 
Government of J&K

Courses 
The college offers three year bachelor courses in Arts, Science, Social Science, Commerce, Computer Science, Business Administration

Bachelor courses

Bachelors in Arts
Bachelors in Arts (Social Science) 
Bachelors in Science (Medical)
Bachelors in Science (Non-Medical)
BBA
BCA(Newly introduced)
B.Com
 The college has introduced many job oriented subjects in 2018 which include food science & technology, bio-technology, bio-chemistry etc. GDC Shopian is the second college in Kashmir valley after Women's College M.A. Road Srinagar to start food science & technology subject as one of the core subject in UG. 
 The GDC Shopian College is the only college in J&K to start horticulture subject as one of the subject in science stream.

References 

Degree colleges in Kashmir Division
Universities and colleges in Jammu and Kashmir
University of Kashmir
1988 establishments in Jammu and Kashmir
Educational institutions established in 1988